Ponneri is a taluk of Tiruvallur district of the Indian state of Tamil Nadu. The headquarters of the taluk is the town of Ponneri.

Demographics
According to the 2011 census, the taluk of Ponneri had a population of 385,620 with 193,043  males and 192,577 females. There were 998 women for every 1000 men. The taluk had a literacy rate of 70.81. Child population in the age group below 6 was 19,639 Males and 18,808 Females.

See also
Seemapuram
Madhavaram

References 

Taluks of Tiruvallur district